Bret Robert Boone (born April 6, 1969) is a former Major League Baseball second baseman. During his career Boone was a three-time All-Star, four-time Gold Glove winner, and two-time Silver Slugger Award winner. He is a third generation professional athlete. His brother is Aaron Boone, manager of the New York Yankees.

Personal life
Boone was born in El Cajon, California to Susan G. Roel and former major league player and manager Bob Boone. He is also the grandson of former major leaguer Ray Boone and brother of former major leaguer and current New York Yankees manager Aaron Boone, as well as a descendant of pioneer Daniel Boone. As a child, Boone hung out in the Phillies clubhouse with Pete Rose Jr., his brother Aaron, Ryan Luzinski, and Mark McGraw. 

He is a graduate of El Dorado High School in Placentia, California.  Boone attended the University of Southern California and played for the team, but left after his junior year of college when he was drafted by the Seattle Mariners in the fifth round. In 2016 Boone released an autobiography, Home Game: Big-League Stories from My Life in Baseball's First Family.

Professional career

In , Boone became the first-ever third-generation big-leaguer in baseball history. As a member of an All-Star family, he is the son of Bob, a catcher for the Philadelphia Phillies, California Angels and Kansas City Royals (–) and later a manager with the Royals and Cincinnati Reds; his brother Aaron was a third baseman who has played with the Reds, New York Yankees, Cleveland Indians, Florida Marlins, and Houston Astros and is now the manager of the New York Yankees. His grandfather Ray was an infielder for the Indians, Detroit Tigers, Chicago White Sox, Kansas City Athletics, Milwaukee Braves and Boston Red Sox (–).

On the last day of the 1998 season, the Reds helped him make baseball trivia history by starting the only infield ever composed of two sets of brothers: first baseman Stephen Larkin, second baseman Bret Boone, shortstop Barry Larkin, and third baseman Aaron Boone.

Seattle Mariners
Boone started his playing career with the Seattle Mariners where he set the club record for home runs in a season by second baseman in 1993 (12 in 76 games) but was traded that same year to the Cincinnati Reds along with Erik Hanson.

Cincinnati Reds

In 2001 Boone returned to the Seattle Mariners, the organization with which he came up from 1990 to 1993. Now an All-Star—having averaged 21 home runs a year from 1998 through 2000, twice reaching a career high in doubles (at 38, in 1998 and 1999) -- Boone's superior play continued as he led the league in runs batted in (141), while producing a batting average of (.331). He also broke the Mariners' team record of home runs for a second baseman with his 37 home runs while hitting 37 doubles.

Boone started in the All-Star Game at Safeco Field, received a Silver Slugger Award and finished third in the AL MVP voting. His Mariners paced the league with a record 116 wins, earning the AL West championship and advancing to the ALCS, tying the all-time team record for wins in a season with the  Chicago Cubs.

The following year Boone won a Gold Glove Award for his defense and continued to show the power he had demonstrated the previous years, hitting 24 home runs with 34 doubles. On May 2, 2002, Boone and teammate Mike Cameron became the first teammates to each hit two home runs in a single inning, doing so in the first inning against the White Sox. With local media and behind the scenes he was famous for his humorous behavior. Boone took up not one but three lockers, as Erick Walker notes, "one for him, another with a nameplate above that read 'Boone's friend' and a third with a nameplate that read 'Boone's friend's friend' that was scattered with about 100 bats."

Minnesota Twins
He was designated for assignment by the Seattle Mariners on July 3, 2005, and later traded on July 11 to Minnesota for cash and a player (minor league pitcher Andy Baldwin) to be named later. Minnesota released Boone on August 1 after only 14 games, where the second baseman struggled with a .221 batting average, with 7 home runs and 37 RBI in 88 games for the Mariners and Twins.

New York Mets
On January 4, Boone signed a minor league contract with the New York Mets. He received an invitation to spring training, but on March 1, only a few days into spring training, he announced his initial retirement from baseball, citing a lack of passion for the game.

Washington Nationals
On February 18, Boone came out of retirement and signed a minor league contract with the Washington Nationals. At first he was assigned to the minor league camp, but after five days, he was invited to the team's major league spring training camp. On March 21, 2008, Boone was reassigned to minor league camp after hitting .189 and began the season with the Columbus Clippers, the Nationals Triple-A affiliate. He hoped to get signed by a major league club, and left the Clippers in late April to work out on his own. However, on May 28, he once again announced his retirement. On March 9, 2010, he was named manager of the Victoria Seals of the Golden Baseball League. On May 27, 2010, after managing just four games, the Seals announced Boone was leaving the team permanently to deal with "family matters".

Legacy
Bret Boone had his best years as a Seattle Mariner, where he is still a fan favorite. He finished his career with a .266 batting average, 252 home runs and 1,021 RBI in 1,780 games in 14 Major League seasons. He was a three-time All-Star, four-time Gold Glove winner, and participated in two Home Run Derbies.

Steroid controversy
Jose Canseco, in his book Juiced, accused Boone of steroid use, saying that in a 2001 spring training game he was stunned at Boone's physique, and the two chatted about what Boone was taking. However, Boone has denied taking steroids, or having any such conversation with Canseco, pointing out that he never played against Canseco during the 2001 spring training. In fact, Canseco never reached second base in any of the five games the Mariners played the Angels, where the conversation is alleged to have occurred. Canseco was then cut by the Angels on March 28.

Related links
List of NL Gold Glove winners at second base
List of Major League Baseball career home run leaders
List of second generation MLB players
List of Major League Baseball career runs batted in leaders
List of Major League Baseball annual runs batted in leaders

See also
Third-generation Major League Baseball families
List of Major League Baseball annual runs batted in leaders
List of Silver Slugger Award winners at second base
List of Gold Glove Award winners at second base

References

External links

1969 births
Living people
Sportspeople from El Cajon, California
National League All-Stars
American League All-Stars
American League RBI champions
Atlanta Braves players
Cincinnati Reds players
Minnesota Twins players
San Diego Padres players
Seattle Mariners players
Major League Baseball second basemen
Gold Glove Award winners
USC Trojans baseball players
Indianapolis Indians players
Jacksonville Suns players
Baseball players from California
Columbus Clippers players
Silver Slugger Award winners
Alaska Goldpanners of Fairbanks players